The Northcountry Women's Coffeehouse in Duluth, Minnesota first opened in 1981. First serving as a "safe space" for women, The Coffeehouse quickly became the center for women's culture, music, and social gatherings in Duluth.

References

Coffeehouses and cafés in the United States
1981 establishments in Minnesota
Duluth, Minnesota